Pranas Vilkas (born 1936) is a Lithuanian politician.

Vilkas was a member of the Seimas (Lithuanian parliament) from 2000 to 2008.
From 2000 to 2003, Vilkas was a member of the Liberal Union. From 2003 to 2004 he was a member of the Liberal Democratic Party (now called Order and Justice).
From 2004 to 2008, Vilkas was a member of Seimas as a representative of the Labour Party.

References

1936 births
Living people
Members of the Seimas
Place of birth missing (living people)
21st-century Lithuanian politicians
Liberal Union of Lithuania politicians
Order and Justice politicians
Labour Party (Lithuania) politicians
Kaunas University of Technology alumni
People from Jonava District Municipality